The following is a list of notable poets of Slovak literature.

Renaissance (1500–1650) 
 Martin Rakovský (1535–1579)
 Vavrinec Benedikt z Nedožier (Laurentius Benedictus Nudozierinus) (1555–1615)

Baroque (1650–1780) 
 Juraj Tranovský or Tranoscius (1592–1637)
 Daniel Sinapius-Horčička (1640–1688)
 Hugolín Gavlovič (1712–1787)

Classicism (1780–1840) 
 Pavel Jozef Šafárik (1795–1861)
 Ján Kollár (1793–1852)
 Ján Hollý (1785–1849)

Romantism (1840–1850) 
 Ľudovít Štúr (1815–1856)
 Samo Chalupka (1812–1883)
 Andrej Sládkovič (1820–1872)
 Janko Kráľ (1822–1876)
 Ján Botto (1829–1881)
 Janko Matúška (1821–1877)
 Michal Miloslav Hodža (1811–1870)

Realism (1875–1905) 

 Pavol Országh-Hviezdoslav (1849–1921)
 Martin Kukučín (1860–1928)
 Janko Jesenský (1874–1945)
 Ľudmila Podjavorinská (1872–1951)

Modernism (1905–1918) 
 Ivan Krasko (1876–1958)
 Janko Jesenský (1874–1945)
 Martin Orgoník-Kunovský (1887–1916)

Between the World Wars (1918–1948) 
 Štefan Krčméry (1892–1955)
 Martin Rázus (1888–1937)
Ján Poničan  (1902–1978)
Peter Jilemnický (1901–1949)
Laco Novomeský (1904–1976)
Maša Haľamová (1908–1995)

Surrealism 
 Štefan Žáry (1918–2007)
 Ján Brezina (1917–1997)

Contemporary (since the 1960s) 
 Miroslav Válek (1927–1991)
 Milan Rúfus (1928–2009)
 Ľubomír Feldek (born 1936)
 Milan Richter (born 1948)
 Jana Kantorová-Báliková (born 1950)
 Juraj Kuniak (born 1955)
 Dana Podracká (born 1954)
 Viera Prokešová (1957–2008)
 Pavol Hudák (1959–2011)
 Eva Kováčová (1951–2010)

Contemporary poetry (since 1995)
 Radovan Brenkus (born 1974)
 Radoslav Rochallyi (born 1980)

See also

List of national poetries
Slovak prose

References 

 
Slovak
Poets

sl:Slovaška književnost